Peter Shuvalov may refer to:

 Peter Ivanovich Shuvalov (1711–1762), Russian statesman and field marshal
 Pyotr Andreyevich Shuvalov (1827–1889), Russian statesman and counselor to Tsar Alexander II